Martin Tucker Smith (6 July 1803 – 10 October 1880) was an English banker and Liberal Party politician.

Biography

Early life
Martin Tucker Smith was born on 6 July 1803. He was the second son of John Smith (1767–1842), and his wife Elizabeth (née Tucker). His father was a member of the family which owned the Smith's Bank group of companies, and Martin joined the family business, becoming a partner in the London bank Smith, Payne and Smiths.

Career
Like his father and many of his ancestors, Smith entered politics. At the 1831 general election he was elected as one of the two Members of Parliament (MPs) for Midhurst in Sussex, a rotten borough in the control of his first cousin Lord Carrington. However, the borough's representation was reduced to one member in 1832, and Smith stood down. He did not re-enter Parliament until the 1847 general election when he was elected unopposed as one of the two MPs for the borough of Wycombe in Buckinghamshire. He was re-elected at the next three general elections, before standing down at the 1865 general election.

Personal life and death
In 1831, he married Louisa Ridley, the daughter of Sir Matthew White Ridley, 3rd Baronet; they had ten children. His third son Gerard Smith (1839–1920) was a British Army officer and banker who served as MP for Wycombe from 1883 to 1885, and as Governor of Western Australia from 1895 to 1900.

After his death in 1880 at the age of 77, his estate was valued at £350,000 (equivalent to £ in  values).

References

External links 
 

1803 births
1880 deaths
Directors of the British East India Company
English bankers
Liberal Party (UK) MPs for English constituencies
Martin
UK MPs 1831–1832
UK MPs 1847–1852
UK MPs 1852–1857
UK MPs 1857–1859
UK MPs 1859–1865
19th-century English businesspeople